The 2017–18 season of the Bermudian Premier Division (also known as the Digicel Premier Division for sponsorship reasons) is the 55th season of top-tier football in Bermuda. It started on September 23, 2017 and ended on April 5, 2018 with PHC Zebras being crowned champions.

Standings

References

External links 
Bermuda FA

Bermudian Premier Division seasons
Bermuda
1